The OMX Iceland 10 is a stock market index consisting of the ten largest companies listed on the Iceland Stock Exchange.
It was updated to OMXI10 index as of July 2019 (from OMX Iceland 8), to reflect the progress made on the market in recent years, where the market has both grown in size and become more liquid.

Composition

Sources 

Economy of Iceland
European stock market indices
Nasdaq Nordic